Bundaleer Station was a pastoral lease that operated as a sheep station in South Australia.

 

In 1854, Charles Brown Fisher bought Bundaleer from Hughes for £31,000.

By 1864 it was estimated that the property was carrying about 80,000 sheep worth over £40,000.

See also
List of ranches and stations

References

Pastoral leases in South Australia
Stations (Australian agriculture)
1841 establishments in Australia